Zaragoza, officially the Municipality of Zaragoza (Ilocano: Ili ti Zaragoza), is a 3rd class municipality in the province of Nueva Ecija, Philippines. According to the 2020 census, it has a population of 53,090 people.

The municipality derived its name from the Zaragoza in Aragon, Spain, out of the colonial past.

It is located at the southern edge of Nueva Ecija bordering the town of La Paz, Tarlac which, due to its proximity, is more closely economically coherent with each other. The newly opened Subic–Clark–Tarlac Expressway (SCTEX) ends up in La Paz where it connects to the Santa Rosa-Tarlac Road passing through Zaragoza and Santa Rosa going to Cabanatuan and on to the Pan-Philippine Highway to Tugegarao, Cagayan.

Zaragoza is bounded by the municipalities of San Antonio and Jaen to the south, Santa Rosa to its east, Aliaga and Licab to the north and La Paz, Tarlac is located west.

The main economic resource of the people of Zaragoza is mainly agricultural, mainly rice production. Duck-raising is also a notable industry. The town's public market is also the main center of commerce for a number of barangays in the neighbouring towns.

History
Founded in 1878, Zaragoza was born as Bario San Vicente upon recommendation of Don Francisco to Governor Cillos. Later, Municipal President Cirilo Acosta moved the town hall building to the present site where the Post Office and Comelec extension offices are located. Mayor Pascual Linsangan completed the building. Mayor Francisco Ramirez added the Sangguniang Bayan Session Hall, with Plaza stage, fountain and fenced the site in 1971. Then Mayor Lydia Pagaduan improved the Town Hall in 2010.

Incidents

On February 17, 2003, Police filed arson and grave threats cases against a local New People's Army (NPA) leader Ka Adrian, team leader of the NPAs Sandatahang Yunit Propaganda, and 5 other members of the Tarlac Provincial Party Committee with the Zaragoza Municipal Trial Court for the January 2003 attack on the Globe Telecom cell-site.

On April 11, 2012, 3 bodies of family members, Pastor Fernandito de Guzman, his wife Rosalinda and 21-year-old son Norie were discovered in Barangay Mayamot, Zaragoza, Nueva Ecija on Wednesday morning. De Guzman was abducted by 3 armed men allegedly being National Bureau of Investigation (NBI) agents.

On May 19, 2012, retired police and former municipal councilor, Napoleon Paraton, 48, was gunned down by 2 armed men at Barangay Santo Rosario Old, Zaragoza, Nueva Ecija.

July 30, 2012, the 64-kilometer Central Luzon Expressway (CLEx), from the Hacienda Luisita interchange of the Subic–Clark–Tarlac Expressway (SCTEx) in Tarlac City to San Jose City in Nueva Ecija will be built in 2 phases.  It will benefit Zaragoza for it will pass through parts of Tarlac City and La Paz town in Tarlac to Zaragoza, inter alia.

On Saturday, December 23, 2012, Nila Mactal, 62, the high school principal of Zaragoza National High School in Zaragoza town was shot and killed by a lone gunman at her Aliaga, Nueva Ecija house.

On June 10, 2018, a month before his 44th birthday, Fr Richmond Nilo, 43, a Catholic priest who was serving as parish priest of the St Vincent Ferrer Catholic Church, was shot and killed in the Nuestra Senora de las Nieve chapel in Barangay Mayamot.

Geography

Barangays
Zaragoza is politically subdivided into 19 barangays.

Climate

Demographics

Economy 

Zaragoza is an agricultural 3rd- class municipality in Nueva Ecija.Its located in Western part of Nueva Ecija bounded municipality with La Paz in Tarlac.

Status of economic performance boost rapidly due to commercialization and services.More investors and businesses opened that provide their constituent an opportunity to generate jobs.Zaragoza also center for financing and banking purposes; basic needed not only for their community but also to their neighboring towns of Licab, Aliaga and Quezon in Nueva Ecija and La Paz in Tarlac province.

Government
Pursuant to the Local government in the Philippines, the political seat of the municipal government is located at the Municipal Town Hall. In the History of the Philippines (1521–1898), the Gobernadorcillo is the Chief Executive who holds office in the Presidencia. During the American rule (1898–1946) (History of the Philippines (1898-1946)), the elected Mayor and local officials, including the appointed ones hold office at the Municipal Town Hall. The legislative and executive departments are vested in the Sangguniang Bayan (Session Hall) and Municipal Trial Court, located in the Town Hall.

Zaragoza's incumbent Mayor is Efren O. Nieves and the Vice Mayor Edwin A. Buendia

Tourism
Zaragoza's main attractions are: the Welcome arch, the scenic rice fields, the Town Hall, the Monument of Zaragoza Heroes, Don Cirilo B. Acosta Elementary School and the St. Vincent Ferrer Parish Church, initially constructed in 1849.

St. Vincent Ferrer Parish Church

The 1849 St. Vincent Ferrer Parish Church belongs to the Roman Catholic Diocese of Cabanatuan (Dioecesis of Cabanatuanensi, Suffragan of Lingayen-Dagupan, comprising 16 towns of Southern Nueva Ecija, Cabanatuan, Palayan City and Gapan; Titular: St. Nicholas of Tolentine, September 10; Most Reverend Sofronio A. Bancud, SSS, DD, located at Poblacion, Zaragoza, 3110 Nueva Ecija; Titular: St. Vincent Ferrer, Feast is April 5).

Its Parish Priest is Fr. Nezelle O. Lirio. Priests in Residence include Rev. Fr. Joseph B. Azarcon  (School Director)Feast, The Feast day is April 5.

On December 30, 2000, the renovated and rehabilitated Church facade, belfry, baptismal font, vestry, Rectory, Room of the Saints by were blessed by Bishop Sofio Guinto Balce † (11 Nov 1990 Succeeded - 25 Jun 2004 Died).

Saint Vincent Ferrer is an O.P., (23 January 1350 – 5 April 1419) was a Valencian Dominican friar, who gained acclaim as a missionary and a logician. He is honored as a saint of the Catholic Church.

Gallery

References

External links

 [ Philippine Standard Geographic Code]
Philippine Census Information
Local Governance Performance Management System

Municipalities of Nueva Ecija